Leysi Suárez (born September 22, 1985) is a Peruvian dancer, actress and vedette.

Television 
 (2011): El Gran Show 2011 (season 1) ... 7th Place
 (2010 - act.) Recargados de Risa ... Cast
 (2009): Habacilar: Amigos y Rivales Club...   3rd Place
 (2008): El reventón de los sábados ... Co-host
 (2008): La súper movida de Jeanet ... Co-host
 (2007): Así es la vida... Kelly Alegre

Musical Groups 
 (2006–10): Alma Bella...Dancer

References

External links 
 

1987 births
Living people
People from Lima
Peruvian female dancers
Peruvian television actresses
Peruvian vedettes